Omar Faruk (born 11 February 1996) is a Bangladeshi professional footballer who plays as a midfielder in the Bangladesh Premier League with Sheikh Jamal Dhanmondi Club. He was also a member of the Bangladesh national football team during the 2013 SAFF Championship.

Career statistics

International caps

References

Living people
1987 births
Footballers from Dhaka
Bangladesh Football Premier League players
Rahmatganj MFS players
Team BJMC players
Sheikh Jamal Dhanmondi Club players
Bangladeshi footballers
Bangladesh international footballers
Bangladesh youth international footballers
Association football midfielders